This is a list of politicians who served as third party parliamentary leaders (chefs parlementaires) at the National Assembly of Quebec.  Parties with fewer than twelve Members of the National Assembly (MNA) 12 members and less than 20% of the vote do not have official party status and their members sit as Independents.

Third party leaders with party status
{| border="1" cellpadding="5" cellspacing="0" style="border-collapse: collapse border-color: #444444" class="wikitable sortable"
|- bgcolor="darkgray"
| 
|Parliamentary Leader
|District   (Region)
|Took Office
|Left Office
| Party

|Paul GouinL'Assomption(Lanaudière)19351936Action libérale nationale

|Camille LaurinBourget(Montreal East)19701973Parti Québécois

|Camil SamsonRouyn-Noranda(Abitibi-Témiscamingue)19701972Ralliement créditiste du Québec

|Armand Bois
Saint-Sauveur(Québec)19721973Ralliement créditiste du Québec

|Camil SamsonRouyn-Noranda(Abitibi-Témiscamingue)19731973Ralliement créditiste du Québec

|Rodrigue BironLotbinière(Chaudière-Appalaches)19761980Union Nationale

|Michel Le MoignanGaspé(Gaspésie–Îles-de-la-Madeleine)19801981Union Nationale

|André BoisclairPointe-aux-Trembles(Montreal East)20072007 Parti Québécois

|François GendronAbitibi-Ouest(Abitibi-Témiscamingue)20072007<td> Parti Québécois

|Pauline Marois<td>Charlevoix(Québec)<td>2007<td>2008<td> Parti Québécois

|Sylvie Roy<td>Lotbinière(Chaudière-Appalaches)<td>2009<td>2009<td> Action démocratique du Québec

|François Bonnardel<td>Shefford(Montérégie)<td>2009<td>2009<td> Action démocratique du Québec

|Gérard Deltell<td>Chauveau(Capitale-Nationale)<td>2009<td>2012<td> Action démocratique du Québec

|François Legault<td>L'Assomption(Lanaudière)<td>2012<td>2018<td> Coalition Avenir Québec

|Manon Massé<td>Sainte-Marie–Saint-Jacques <td> 2018 <td> present <td> Québec solidaire
|}

Third party leaders without party status

See also
 List of Quebec general elections
 Timeline of Quebec history
 National Assembly of Quebec
 List of Quebec premiers
 List of Deputy Premiers of Quebec
 List of leaders of the Official Opposition (Quebec)
 History of Quebec

References

External links
 Les chefs de l'opposition officielle depuis 1869 

Third party leaders
Quebec
Third party leaders